General Zod is a supervillain appearing in American comic books published by DC Comics, commonly known as an adversary of the superhero Superman. The character, who first appeared in Adventure Comics #283 (April 1961), was created by Robert Bernstein and initially designed by George Papp. As a Kryptonian, he exhibits the same powers and abilities as Superman and is consequently viewed as one of his greatest enemies alongside Lex Luthor, Darkseid and Brainiac. He is also well known for his famous catchphrase, “Kneel before Zod!”

Originally depicted as bald and clean-shaven, Zod's look in popular culture was defined by the character's depiction by Terence Stamp in the films Superman (1978) and Superman II (1981). Eventually, the character was reintroduced to the DC Multiverse with black hair and a goatee beard. A different incarnation of Zod was portrayed by Michael Shannon in the DC Extended Universe films Man of Steel (2013) and The Flash (2023).

Fictional character biography

Silver Age
Dru-Zod is a megalomaniacal Kryptonian, in charge of the military forces on Krypton. He knows Jor-El, Superman's father, when Jor-El is an aspiring scientist. When the space program is abolished after the destruction of the inhabited moon Wegthor (engineered by renegade scientist Jax-Ur), Zod attempts to take over Krypton using an army of robotic duplicates of himself, all bearing a resemblance to Bizarro. He is sentenced to exile in the Phantom Zone for 40 years for his crimes. Zod is eventually released by Superman when his term of imprisonment is up. However, he attempts to conquer Earth with the superpowers his Kryptonian body acquires under the yellow sun (the source of Superman's own super-powers). With Zod's threat now obvious, Superman is forced to oppose him and ultimately returns him to the Zone.

During the remaining years before the Crisis on Infinite Earths, Zod and other Zone inmates such as Jax-Ur, Faora Hu-Ul and others, escape from the Phantom Zone and battle Superman and Supergirl numerous times, always being defeated in the end and returned to the Zone.

Modern Age

Interim Zods: 1985–2005

The first Zod to be introduced following Crisis on Infinite Earths is the Zod of a so-called "pocket universe" resembling the universe in which the comics take place; this allowed for a "Kryptonian" Zod to be introduced while maintaining Superman's status as the last of his race in the universe proper. This Zod's universe is created by the Time Trapper. Zod (along with companions Quex-Ul and Zaora) devastate the Earth of that universe following the death of its Superboy, despite the best efforts of a Supergirl created by that world's heroic Lex Luthor. Eventually, the survivors of this world manage to contact the Superman of the main universe to help them, and he is able to take away the powers of the three super-criminals with Gold Kryptonite (since he is not from that universe, the Kryptonite of that reality has no effect on him).

However, the three vow to some day regain their powers and return to Superman's world to kill him. Acknowledging that he can neither afford to leave them on the now-dead pocket Earth to let them die alone nor imprison them on his world, Superman is forced to execute them with Green Kryptonite.

A second incarnation of General Zod is introduced in the 2001 storyline "Return to Krypton"; this Zod is portrayed as that of an alternate reality created by the character Brainiac 13. He is the head of the Kryptonian military in the alternate reality. Like the Pre-Crisis version, Zod holds the Kryptonian equivalent of fascist beliefs. He sends aliens to the bottle city of Kandor and plans a military coup. Zod is defeated by Superman and the Jor-El of Zod's alternate reality Krypton.

The third attempt to bring Zod to Modern Age comics is the "Russian" Zod, a Zod of human origin whose origin story is connected to Superman's. This General Zod (born Avruiskin) is a Russian who is affected before his birth by Kryptonite radiation, since he is the son of two cosmonauts whose ship was too close to Kal-El's rocketship. This Zod is unnaturally weak under a yellow sun, but superpowered under a red sun (the opposite of Superman). After his parents die from radiation, he grows up in a KGB laboratory under the name "Zed". Apparently spoken to by the spirit of the Pocket Universe Zod, Russian Zod creates a suit of red armor which filters the sunlight, and declares himself ruler of the fictional former Soviet state of Pokolistan. After several inconclusive encounters with Superman, he reveales his long-range plan to turn the sun red and take Superman's place. This is temporarily successful until Lex Luthor rescues Superman, gives him a blast of yellow solar radiation to regain his powers, and works to restore the sun. Superman returns to battle Zod, but refuses to kill him. When the sun turns yellow again, the now-vulnerable Zod strikes Superman with all his power at super-speed and is killed due to Superman's invulnerability.

The final Zod before the character was finally reintroduced, the Zod of an alternate Phantom Zone appears in the twelve-issue For Tomorrow storyline, written by Brian Azzarello and penciled by Jim Lee. This Zod lives alone in an alternate Phantom Zone and resents Superman for tampering with it. By his own account he comes from the same Krypton as Superman and was exiled to the Phantom Zone by Superman's father, Jor-El. This Zod wears large, spiked black armor and when unmasked, is a bald, white-bearded old man. This incarnation also uses a variation of "Kneel before Zod". He appears in Metropia, a version of the Phantom Zone created by Superman to resemble a living world (including apparently-living beings). This version was superseded by the present storyline (which features a new Zod, freed from the Phantom Zone).

General Zod returns: 2006–2011
General Zod appears in "Last Son". Zod, Ursa, and Non escape from the Phantom Zone and come to Earth to try to turn it into a "New Krypton". This incarnation is the first Post-Crisis Zod who comes from Superman's Krypton, and not from an alternate reality.

The backstory for the three Kryptonians was recounted in Action Comics Annual #10 (April 2007), and Zod's origin was revealed in Countdown #30 (October 2007). Prior to the destruction of Krypton, Zod, his wife Ursa, and accomplice Non rebell against their planet's oppressive government, but soon become lawless would-be tyrants who lust for power. After an ill-fated insurrection led by Zod, the government sentences the trio to death. However, Superman's father Jor-El pleads for the government to mitigate their sentence to imprisonment in the Phantom Zone, accepted on the condition that he would assume responsibility as their jailer. While in the Phantom Zone, Zod and Ursa are able to have a child who is born immune to the Phantom Zone's effects, ultimately facilitating their escape, and name him Lor-Zod. On Earth, the boy is discovered by Superman and his wife Lois Lane, who adopt him as their own son and name him Christopher Kent. For the duration of 2007's "Last Son" storyline in Action Comics, Chris Kent is depicted as an adopted son of Superman and his wife Lois across DC titles.

Alongside Zod, Ursa and Non, 25 other Kryptonian criminals also escape the Zone and defeat a number of Earth's heroes, beginning their quest to conquer the planet. Zod ambushes Superman in revenge for Jor-El's actions and traps him in the Phantom Zone, which he later escapes with the help of the heroic Phantom Zone prisoner Mon-El. With assistance from his traditional enemies Lex Luthor, Metallo, Parasite and Bizarro, Superman takes on Zod's army. Out of nearly thirty Kryptonians, Superman's temporary allies successfully kill several, driving the rest back into the Phantom Zone alongside Zod and Ursa, who take Chris Kent with them.

In the later "New Krypton" arc storyline however, Zod is freed from the Phantom Zone once again by Supergirl's mother Alura. The "bottled city of Kandor" is transformed into a populated Kryptonian planet ("New Krypton"), and Zod is appointed the leader of its army. In the "World of New Krypton" Action Comics storyline, when Superman decides to see what life is like on New Krypton, he is drafted into the Military Guild under General Zod. Zod and Superman maintain a mistrustful professional relationship. Despite their past, neither seems prepared to behave with marked aggression toward the other. Later, during a Kryptonian ceremony, Zod is shot by the Kryptonian Ral-Dar (who is working with Lois's father General Sam Lane), leading Zod to appoint Superman as temporary General until his recovery. The two are involved in a Kryptonian political plot, but ultimately apprehend the planet's traitor and see a reform of New Krypton's Council.

Peace is short-lived, however, due to an attack by the alien Brainiac, who had been responsible for the bottling of Kandor in the first place. In "Last Stand of New Krypton", New Krypton comes under attack by Brainiac, and Zod engineers a plan to defeat him; Zod is driven by an urge to avenge his prior defeat at the hands of the Coluan Brainiac, when Kandor was bottled from Old Krypton. The storyline ends with the planet's destruction, leading Zod to declare war on Earth, sparking the "War of the Supermen" storyline. After a fierce conflict between Superman and Zod in defence of Earth, Zod is pushed back into the Phantom Zone by his son, Chris Kent, who had freed himself from the Phantom Zone and became active as an adult superhero on planet Earth.

The New 52: 2011–2016
In 2011, DC chose to revamp its continuity, rebooting many characters while retaining the histories for some others, as part of its The New 52 publishing event. Following this, Zod is hinted at several times. A character resembling Zod makes a cameo in Action Comics #5 (March 2012), as a prisoner in the Phantom Zone; and in Action Comics #13 (December 2012) a ghost in the Phantom Zone says "Kneel before..." multiple times while attacking Superman, a reference to Zod's iconic saying. Zod makes his first full appearance in Action Comics #23.2: General Zod (September 2013), written by Greg Pak, with art by Ken Lashley.

A new origin for Zod is introduced. In it, Zod is born to scientist parents. When he is a young boy, Zod and his parents travel to Krypton's wilderness in order to discover new creatures. Their ship is attacked by creatures, leaving the family stranded in the jungle. While his parents are killed by the animals, Zod manages to survive for one year until Jor-El and his older brother Zor-El save him. After reaching adulthood, Zod becomes one of Krypton's best soldiers, attaining the rank of general. Zod developes a hatred towards an alien species called the Char and secretly orders the creation of a Char-looking creature, unleashing it on Krypton's population, so he can justify a war against the Char. Jor-El discovers the deception and turns Zod over to the authorities. The council finds Zod guilty of treason and banishes him and his closest followers, Faora and Non, to the Phantom Zone.

Many years later, a mysterious event causes the Phantom Zone to weaken, allowing some of its prisoners to escape into normal space. Zod travels to Earth, landing in the Sahara Desert. There, his Kryptonian powers begin to manifest for the first time, brutally slaughtering a group of travelers. Zod is soon attacked by the Justice League of America until Superman and Wonder Woman arrive, the latter restraining him with her magic lasso. Zod recognizes Superman as Kal-El, the son of Jor-El. Superman decides to keep Zod in the Fortress of Solitude's alien zoo. While there, he reveals that Faora also traveled to Earth with him, and vows to track her down.

DC Universe
In June 2016, the DC Rebirth event relaunched DC Comics' entire line of comic book titles, in which General Zod continues to appear within DC titles. In December 2017, DC Comics ended the Rebirth branding, opting to include everything under a larger DC Universe banner and naming.  As part of the DC Rebirth relaunch, General Zod is once again imprisoned within the Phantom Zone. He is trapped within the boundaries of the Black Vault, a secret facility hidden in the Laptev Sea. Amanda Waller sends the Suicide Squad to steal the contents of the Black Vault and bring them back to her; however, in unlocking the previously hermetically sealed area, they unwittingly allow Zod to tear open the now unstable link between Earth and the Phantom Zone and once again break free. She attempts to 'recruit' Zod by implanting a kryptonite explosive in his head, but he finally proves too dangerous when he uses a mirror and his heat vision to literally cut the bomb out of his own skull, forcing Rick Flag to sacrifice himself to seal the Zone before Zod can release his army. Zod manages to retrieve his family from the Zone while fighting alongside the Superman Revenge Squad- Cyborg Superman, Eradicator, Mongul and Metallo- and escapes Earth to establish himself as a dictator on another planet with his family. He nearly kills Hal Jordan when the Green Lantern Corps discover his presence on the planet before both sides are forced to withdraw and recuperate.

Powers and abilities
Like all Kryptonians under a yellow sun, General Zod possesses high-level superhuman strength, speed and endurance sufficient to stand against Superman and other Kryptonians; super hearing; x-ray vision; telescopic, microscopic and heat vision; super-breath and freeze-breath; virtual invulnerability; accelerated healing and flight. Due to his background as a Kryptonian general, Zod possesses a detailed knowledge of military tactics, battle strategy, and is a competent military leader. Because he was trained in fighting arts long before receiving his abilities, he typically has an edge over Superman's brawling skills, over-reliance on superhuman strength, and basic knowledge of advanced human and Kryptonian hand-to-hand combat. However, Zod's powers are often inferior to those of Superman, due to the latter being exposed to the yellow sun over the course of his entire life, while Zod typically only gets exposed for a short period of time before being defeated and returned to the Phantom Zone. This greater power combined with his superior control and experience with it gives Superman an edge over Zod's superior fighting skills. Additionally, similar to Superman, his strength is inferior to the likes of Doomsday and his speed is inferior to Speedsters such as the Flash. Like all Kryptonians, he is vulnerable to Kryptonite and red solar radiation; his durability does not provide protection from mind control and magic; and his strength and durability both have limits in that he cannot survive an atomic explosion without nearly fatal injuries and there are weights he cannot lift due to natural bodily limitation even under the empowering environment of a yellow sun as well as normal limits of adult Kryptonian superhuman strength.

Other versions

Earth-15
The General Zod of Earth-15 is this world's Superman, here as a semi-retired champion of this peaceful Earth. This version is later killed by the psychotic Superman Prime, who was angry because Zod was "not a manic", as well as killing Zod's wife and unborn child.

JSA: The Liberty Files
The Zod of JSA: The Liberty Files is not a general of any kind. He is recast as a sociopathic 11-year-old, who creates a deadly synthetic virus on Krypton for no reason other than fun. Zod is banished to the Phantom Zone because of his actions (the first child ever sent to the Zone) until American scientists breach the Zone and discover him. Taken in by the government and named "Clark Kent", Zod fools most of his adult superiors by playing the role of a scared child until he grows up and becomes the adult "Super-Man". In the sequel series JSA: The Unholy Three, Super-Man is sent into Eastern Europe with the Bat and the Clock. He fights Parasite and Steelwolf, while investigating his sole weakness: a nuclear device the Russians created. Finding his information, he incapacitates or kills several agents and heads into Russia to destroy the device. However, he is ultimately killed before he can finish the job.

Superman: Earth One
Zod appears in Superman: Earth One in which he is called Zod-El, brother to Jor-El and thus Superman's uncle. Zod-El is a Kryptonian soldier who wages a six-month civil war against the Science Council, and the one responsible for Krypton's destruction by striking a deal with the Krypton's warring neighbor Dheronians. After the Dheronian Tyrell's defeat and absorbing energy from a yellow star, Zod goes to Earth to deal with Superman. He is later  depowered by the Luthors after Alexander shoots him with a radiation beam (destroying his Kryptonian armor), but not before killing him and thus driving his wife Lex to hate Superman.

Injustice 2
"Zod" appears in the prequel to the Injustice 2 video game. When Batman and the Insurgency rescue the Teen Titans from their imprisonment by Superman in the Phantom Zone, Zod uses the opportunity to escape the prison and murders Tim Drake in the process. An enraged Batman activates his Endgame protocol and combats Zod with a heavily armored suit. He takes Zod down with kryptonite infused fear gas, which Batman himself swore he'd never use given to what it did to Superman in this reality. He gets the upper hand on Zod with the kryptonite gas making it appear like Superman is defeating him, but when it wears off, Ra's Al Ghul (knowing Zod's kryptonian purist ideals wouldn't match with his own) sends Amazo to combat the general. Amazo kills Zod by twisting his head off. His heart is then surgically removed by the retired Doctor Mid-Nite Charles McNider and placed inside Superboy's body so he can live outside the Phantom Zone.

The real Zod later appears in this universe in the ending of Sub-Zero.

DC Animated Universe
While not appearing in the DC animated universe television shows, General Zod (depicted as an Argosian mad criminal) appears in Superman Adventures #21 and Justice League Unlimited #34 where he teams with Jax-Ur and Mala.

A version of Zod appears in the 2013 digital-first series Justice League Beyond 2.0, taking place in the DC Animated Universe, specifically in the futuristic setting of the Batman Beyond animated series. In this series, Zod is revealed to be the son of Jax-Ur, marking the first appearance of General Zod in the continuity of the Bruce Timm's Superman: The Animated Series, albeit a younger, innocent version of the megalomaniacal General who, in fact, helps the new Justice League. He is later revealed to be the son of Justice Lord Superman and Wonder Woman.

In other media

Television

Animation
 General Zod appears in the Superman episode "The Hunter", voiced by René Auberjonois. This version was imprisoned in the Phantom Zone alongside Ursa and Faora, whom he collaborates with to create the titular "Hunter", a creature that can transmute itself into any substance that it touches, and send it to Earth.
 General Zod did not appear in series set in the DC Animated Universe (DCAU) due to rights issues at the time.
 The Silver Age incarnation of General Zod makes a cameo appearance in the Legion of Super Heroes episode "Phantoms" as an inmate of the Phantom Zone. Additionally, his son Drax-Zod also appears in the episode, voiced by Greg Ellis.
 General Zod appears in the Justice League Action episode "Field Trip", voiced by Jason J. Lewis.
 General Zod appears in The Looney Tunes Show episode "SuperRabbit", voiced by Jeff Bergman. This version is modeled after Daffy Duck and serves as Faora's inattentive, immature, and neglectful boyfriend.
 General Zod appears in the DC Super Hero Girls two-part episode "#DCSuperHeroBoys", voiced by Liam O'Brien. This version is based on the Superman: The Movie and Superman II incarnation of General Zod and was imprisoned in the Phantom Zone by Alura Zor-El. Additionally, an alternate timeline version of Zod appears in the episode "#BackInAFlash".
 Dru-Zod appears in Young Justice: Phantoms, voiced by Phil Morris. This version is the husband of Ursa Zod and father of Lor-Zod who was paroled in the 31st century, but was re-imprisoned in the Phantom Zone by the Legion of Super-Heroes following a failed attempt to conquer the galaxy. In the 21st century, Dru manipulates the amnesiac Superboy into joining him before Lor travels back in time to free his family from the Phantom Zone. Dru leads his forces in an attempt to conquer Earth, only to be re-imprisoned by the Team.

Live-action

 A character based on General Zod named Lord Nor appears in the Lois & Clark: The New Adventures of Superman episode "Lord of the Flys", portrayed by Simon Templeman. He attempts to conquer Earth until he is betrayed by his cohorts and killed by a corrupt Colonel named Cash via a kryptonite warhead while fighting Superman.
 Major Zod appears in Smallville, portrayed primarily by Callum Blue while Sam Witwer provides his initial appearance (albeit uncredited). This version is a native of Kandor before he was imprisoned in the Phantom Zone as a disembodied wraith. The character is alluded to in the fifth and sixth seasons via Zod's disciples Aethyr and Nam-Ek as well as Brainiac's failed attempt at turning Lex Luthor into a superpowered vessel for Zod, and the eighth season with the emergence of his perfect "son" Doomsday with his wife Faora after learning the latter was infertile. The ninth season sees an initially powerless clone of Zod, among other Kryptonian soldiers, being created by Tess Mercer via a Kryptonian device called the "Orb". Despite Clark Kent's efforts at helping the clones live in peace, Zod's powers are eventually restored. After restoring his fellow clones' powers to gain their loyalty and killing Faora's traitorous clone, he begins plotting to fulfill the original Zod's destiny by conquering Earth. However, Kent exposes the truth of Faora's death, turning the clones against him, before using the Book of Rao to send them to an uninhabited planet where they can establish a Kryptonian colony. As of the tenth season episode "Dominion", the clones banished Zod's clone and his loyalists to the Phantom Zone, where he fused with the original Zod while maintaining both versions' memories. He lures Kent and Oliver Queen to the Phantom Zone, but the two escape and destroy the exit, ensuring Zod and his followers cannot escape.
 A hallucination of General Zod appears in the Supergirl episode "Nevertheless, She Persisted", portrayed by Mark Gibbon. While under the influence of silver kryptonite, Superman hallucinates Supergirl as Zod and fights her until he is defeated and cured.
 A time-traveling General Dru-Zod appears in Krypton, portrayed by Colin Salmon. Similarly to the Superman: Earth One incarnation, this version is the son of Lyta-Zod and Seg-El, half-brother of Jor-El, and uncle of Kal-El.
 General Zod's consciousness appears in the Superman & Lois episode "Through the Valley of Death". Having been saved onto the Eradicator, Tal-Rho uses the device to infect Superman with Zod's consciousness. However, John Henry Irons reminds him of his family, allowing Superman to expel Zod's consciousness.

Film

Original series (1978–2006)

 General Zod appears in Superman: The Movie and Superman II, portrayed by Terence Stamp. This version, alongside Ursa and Non, was sentenced by Jor-El of the Science Council to life imprisonment in the Phantom Zone. While the trio eventually escape, gain powers, and form an alliance with Lex Luthor, they are eventually depowered and defeated by Superman. This portrayal of Zod is rated #58 on Wizard magazine's "100 Greatest Villains of All Time" list.
 During early development for Superman Returns, original director Brett Ratner wanted Zod to appear, with Jude Law in the role. However, Law declined when Bryan Singer replaced Ratner, who left to direct X-Men: The Last Stand. As a result, Zod was omitted from the final script.

DC Extended Universe

General Zod appears in films set in the DC Extended Universe (DCEU), portrayed by Michael Shannon.
 Introduced in Man of Steel, this version is a native of Kandor and the head of Krypton's Military Guild who initiated a rebellion and formed a battalion called the "Sword of Rao" after becoming dissatisfied with the Law Council's decisions, only to be apprehended and imprisoned in the Phantom Zone. In the present, following Krypton's destruction, the Sword of Rao escape and travel to Earth to find Superman and the Codex, a device containing the genetic code for all future Kryptonians, so Zod can terraform Earth and repopulate the planet with genetically engineered Kryptonians. Ultimately, Superman and the United States Military thwart Zod by sending his forces back to the Phantom Zone while Zod himself battles the former until Superman reluctantly kills Zod to save a family that he threatened to kill.
 Zod's corpse appears in Batman v Superman: Dawn of Justice. LexCorp takes possession of it, ostensibly to study Kryptonian anatomy and its origins, while Lex Luthor secretly combines the body with his blood and knowledge he stole from an ancient Kryptonian scout ship to create Doomsday.
 Shannon will reprise his role as Zod in The Flash.

Animation
 An alternate reality incarnation of General Zod appears in flashbacks depicted in Justice League: Gods and Monsters, voiced by Bruce Thomas. This version caused Krypton's destruction while siphoning energy from the planet's core to power his war machine and implanted his DNA into Lara Lor-Van's egg to ensure his legacy survives, leading to the birth of this universe's Superman, Hernan Guerra.
 General Zod makes a cameo appearance in The Lego Batman Movie.

Video games
 General Zod, alongside Ursa and Non, appears as the collective final boss of Superman.
 General Zod appears in DC Universe Online, voiced by Alexander Brandon.
 General Zod appears in Lego Batman 2: DC Super Heroes, voiced by Townsend Coleman.
 General Zod appears as a downloadable playable character in Injustice: Gods Among Us, voiced by Nolan North. Additionally, the DCEU incarnation appears as an alternate skin. In his non-canonical arcade mode ending, one of his fellow inmates teaches him how to create small portals to the Phantom Zone. After escaping, Zod traps High Councilor Superman in the Phantom Zone and takes his place in the One-Earth government with the intention of remaking Earth into Krypton's image.
 The DCEU incarnation of General Zod appears as a playable character in Lego Batman 3: Beyond Gotham via DLC.
 General Zod appears as a boss in Lego Dimensions, voiced again by Nolan North. This version serves Lord Vortech.
 General Zod makes a cameo appearance in Sub-Zero's ending in Injustice 2. Following High Councilor Superman's imprisonment in the Phantom Zone, the Justice League accidentally open a portal that allows him, Zod, Ursa, and Non to escape while trying to send Sub-Zero back to his native universe.
 General Zod appears as a playable character in Lego DC Super-Villains.

Miscellaneous
General Zod, also known as Commissioner Dru-Zod, appears in the novel The Last Days of Krypton, by Kevin J. Anderson. This version is the son of Cor-Zod, former head of the Kryptonian Council, and initially a mid-level bureaucrat before he takes advantage of a major planetary cataclysm and the apparent decapitation of the government to seize absolute power as a militaristic despot and use the Phantom Zone to imprison his political enemies until he is overthrown by a resistance movement led by scientist Jor-El and his civic leader brother Zor-El, and banished to the Phantom Zone along with his followers. Afterward, Dru's former prisoners, the planetary council, drop the Phantom Zone singularity into an active volcano to ensure he cannot escape, only to cause Krypton's core to implode and bring about the planet's destruction.

Reception 
Total Film ranked Zod #32 on their "Top 50 Greatest Villains of All Time" list in 2007. Pop-culture website IGN.com ranked General Zod as #30 on their list of the "Top 100 Comic Book Villains".

See also
 List of Superman enemies

References

Action film villains
Characters created by George Papp
Characters created by Robert Bernstein
Comics characters introduced in 1961
DC Comics characters with accelerated healing
DC Comics characters with superhuman strength
DC Comics characters who can move at superhuman speeds
DC Comics extraterrestrial supervillains
DC Comics male supervillains
DC Comics martial artists
DC Comics military personnel
DC Comics film characters
Fictional characters with absorption or parasitic abilities
Fictional characters with air or wind abilities
Fictional characters with energy-manipulation abilities
Fictional characters with fire or heat abilities
Fictional characters with ice or cold abilities
Fictional characters with nuclear or radiation abilities
Fictional characters with slowed ageing
Fictional characters with superhuman durability or invulnerability
Fictional characters with superhuman senses
Fictional characters with X-ray vision
Fictional marksmen and snipers
Fictional mass murderers
Fictional generals
Kryptonians
Suicide Squad members
Superman characters